Full Moon is the third studio album by American singer Brandy. It was released by Atlantic Records on March 5, 2002 in the United States. The album was recorded primarily during the summer and fall of 2001 at the Hit Factory Criteria in Miami, amid a three-year musical hiatus following the success of her multi-platinum previous studio album Never Say Never (1998) and the finale of her highly successful television sitcom Moesha in May 2001. As with Never Say Never, Brandy collaborated with producer Rodney Jerkins and his Darkchild production and songwriting team on the majority of the album's composition, while Mike City, Warryn Campbell, and Keith Crouch contributed additional production.

Brandy credited Whitney Houston, Kim Burrell and Enya for inspiring her to push the limits of her voice and vocal arrangements. Jerkins credited Michael Jackson, Brandy's voice, and his experiences at European nightclubs for influencing the sound of the album. Her prior relationship and then-private relationship with Darkchild in-house producer Big Bert inspired the lyrics and song concepts. Musically, Full Moon drew inspiration from UK garage, electro, dance, glitch, and funktronica, while blending soul and R&B elements into adult contemporary ballads.

The album was initially met with mixed reviews from critics, but later earned recognition from musicians, singers, and producers, primarily for Brandy's vocal work. It debuted at number two on the US Billboard 200 and atop the US Top R&B/Hip-Hop Albums, selling 156,000 copies in its first week, and has been certified platinum by the Recording Industry Association of America (RIAA), selling over one million copies in the United States. Full Moon was nominated for several awards, including the Grammy Award for Best Contemporary R&B Album. The album spawned three singles–"What About Us?", "Full Moon" and "He Is".

Background

In June 1998, Norwood released her second album Never Say Never. Boosted by the success of its number-one lead single "The Boy Is Mine", a duet with singer Monica, it facilitated Norwood in becoming a viable recording artist with cross-media appeal. In total, the album sold sixteen million copies worldwide and spawned seven singles, including Norwood's second number-one song, the Diane Warren-penned "Have You Ever?". Also in 1998, Norwood made her big screen debut in a supporting role in the slasher sequel, I Still Know What You Did Last Summer, which garnered her both a Blockbuster Entertainment Award and an MTV Movie Award nomination for Best Breakthrough Female Performance. The following year, she co-starred with Diana Ross in the telefilm drama Double Platinum about an intense, strained relationship between a mother and daughter. Both Norwood and Ross served as executive producers of the movie, which features original songs from Never Say Never and Ross's Every Day Is a New Day (1999).

Norwood suffered a nervous breakdown in November 1999the result of her then-hectic and unhealthy lifestyle and a failed relationship in which she had experienced emotional abuse. Frightened by the idea that a yet-to-be-made third album would not be able to live up to the success of her previous albums, Norwood went on a lengthy hiatus to reflect and introspect. "I needed to rejuvenate, get my creative juices flowing, balance my life with some privacy, to find my confidence, find my love of music again," she told Jet magazine in 2002. In mid-2000, she started refocusing herself on her musical career, contributing songs to albums such as Urban Renewal (2001) and the Osmosis Jones soundtrack (2001), which introduced a scratchy, evocative edge to Norwood's voice, now having a deeper and warmer tone with a textured lower register and notably stronger head voice.

Recording and production

In fall 2000, Norwood finally began conceiving ideas for a third studio album with the Atlantic label. While Rodney Jerkins, the main producer of her previous album Never Say Never, and his Darkchild crew, including Fred Jerkins III and LaShawn Daniels, had been working on several new songs for the singer's upcoming project in hopes of recreating the winning chemistry of Never Say Never, Norwood wanted to make sure she was gaining more creative control over the project and thus, arranged meetings with all her writers and musicians to discuss the lyrical topics and sounds she wanted for the album. "I was involved from A to Z," she said. "Every song on the album was inspired by my life [...] I wanted to talk about how I feel on so many levels. I wanted to be in touch with all of my emotions and share them. I've taken three years off for myself and got a chance to find things I like to do, things I don't like and things I want to change about myself."

While Jerkins maintained his status as the album's executive producer, contributing most to its track listing with his team that also consisted of regular songwriters Nora Payne and Kenisha Pratt, Norwood also worked with frequent collaborators Mike City and Keith Crouch, as well as Warryn "Baby Dubb" Campbell, Stuart Brawley, Jason Derlatka, and Jerkins' cousin Robert "Big Bert" Smith, with whom she became romantically involved during the project. In addition, she also recorded with Pharrell Williams and Chad Hugo from The Neptunes. With Norwood fearing that the pair's material would not fit the concept of the album and break her type of production unit, it was left unused. Rapper Ja Rule, singer Babyface and production duo Soulshock & Karlin were reportedly also involved into the project but none of their songs eventually made the album's final track listing.

Though Norwood has acknowledged that the creative focus of the album was very much on its technical realization and its sound, she declared Full Moon a concept album based on the development of a male-female relationship: "It's definitely the concept for the albumme falling in love, then going through some turbulence, and then, at the end, I find the person that I really want to be withso it's a great concept and it's a great experience that I had. I found out a lot about myself. I found a lot out about love, and I'm just happy to have that reflect in my music." Norwood decided to name the album after its title track and in reference to the previous three years of her life, stating: "I have done a complete circle and I feel whole. All of that's reflected in the music. That's why I entitled [my album] Full Moon. It's a concept album, it's autobiographical. Everything that I've gone through in the last three years is reflected."

In a 2022 retrospective of the Full Moon recording process, Norwood shared to Billboard, "[ Aaliyah and Timbaland ] were our biggest inspirations. Rodney will tell you that Timbaland is one of his favorite producers. I will tell you the same thing. Aaliyah, her tone, and she stacked vocals, too. She was so amazing. Her music still today is timeless. There’s a song on Full Moon, it’s called “Anybody,” and it’s like an Aaliyah song [...] We just loved how they did what they were guided to do. And I was like, “We gotta do that"."

Music and lyrics
Full Moon opens with "B Rocka Intro", a shortened and rearranged version of "What About Us?" that starts with a robot voice. The title of the intro references producer Rodney Jerkins's nickname for Brandy. The first full song on the album is title track "Full Moon", producer Mike City's only contribution to Full Moon. A piano-dominated up-tempo song with a "lulling drumbeat and heavy bass," Norwood characterized it as urban contemporary, explaining that "Full Moon" is "pop and R&B at the same time [but] has a lot of elements to it." Lyrically, the song deals with a love at first sight during a full moon night. "I Thought", a Jerkins-crafted adamant break-up song about female empowerment, features electro bass lines and crunchy drums. Jerkins described it as an "anthem [and] a flip off" of Brandy's previous single "The Boy Is Mine." "When You Touch Me" is a ballad that revolves around the planning of a rendezvous. Initially conceived by Big Bert, it was significantly polished by Jerkins. Singer-producer Teddy Riley with whom Jerkins worked on Michael Jackson's Invincible (2001) during the creation of Full Moon appears on the talk box segment of the song.

The "hand-clapping, funky" song "Like This" sees Brandy continue to discuss her intimate desires with her lover. On "All in Me", a "futuristically funked-out" song built on keyboards and a sped up breakdown, the singer pleads with her lover to have faith in her, promising him she will provide whatever he needs. Jerkins produced a 2-step groove section for the middle of the song, following a gig in London months before where he was inspired by artists like Craig David and Artful Dodger. "Apart", produced by Keith Crouch, blends neo soul sensibilities, airy pop, and modern R&B with Middle Eastern music. Lyrically, it has the protagnoist lamenting for her partner's attention, resulting in her decision to leave him for the better. "Can We" is a lightweight hip-hop track coated in a batter of futuristic elements on which Brandy requests her partner to clarify their problems, while committing to working through them. "What About Us?" is an offbeat, aggressive high-tech uptempo song, seemingly "set amid a steel factory's sonic churns, whirs and crunches." Brandy described it as "edgy, sexy" and a "little bit ahead of its time." On post-break song "Anybody", another "edgy, eclectic offering," Brandy reminds a lover he is supposed to keep their hurtful relationship a secret.

"Come a Little Closer" is a soft pop ballad that was originally written for NSYNC's Celebrity (2001) but eventually recorded by Canadian boy band I.D. Titled "Make It Last Forever," it appeared on their debut album Identically Different (2001). "It's Not Worth It" finds Brandy trying to hold her relationship together after it has deteriorated to shambles. Initially penned in 1999, Jerkins built the song around Michael Jackson's ad-libbed vocals, resulting from a joint recording session for Jackson's 2001 studio album. "He Is", the next song, is a jazzy love song with "a classy piano and sparse drum track," produced by Warryn Campbell. Speaking about God in third person, Brandy was unaware the song was conceptualized as a gospel song by its writers. "Love Wouldn't Count Me Out" is a "sweeping" hymn that has the singer seeking understanding in the midst of romantic trial, while album closer "Wow" is an upbeat ballad that has Brandy singing about the joy of finally finding the perfect lover over a "sun kissed groove." International editions of Full Moon contain the cover versions "Another Day in Paradise" and "Die Without You", both being duets with her younger brother Ray J, as well as the beat-heavy, hand-clapping song "I Wanna Fall in Love."

Title and artwork 

Norwood recognized the album's creative focus was based on her own technical achievement and sonority, she stated that the album's concept was based on developing the relationship between a man and a woman: "It's definitely the concept for the album – me falling in love, then going through some turbulence and then, right at the end, I meet the person I really want to be with – so it's a wonderful concept and it's an incredible experience that I had. I found out a lot about myself. I found a lot out about love, and I'm just happy that it's reflected in my music." Norwood decided to name the album in honor of its title track and in reference to the previous three years of her life: "I made a complete circle and I feel complete. All of this is reflected in my music. That's why I named [my album] Full Moon . It's a concept album , it's autobiographical . Everything I've been through in the past three years is reflected [in it]."  Although the sound of the album was described as "futuristic", Norwood stated that the concept of futurism happened by chance and was not taken into account throughout the composition of the music and writing of the lyrics.

The album's cover artwork was photographed by Marc Baptiste. It features Norwood up to just beyond the shoulders, sporting long, "lustrous" straight hair, in addition to "heavy" makeup credited to Rea Ann Silva. Additional photos for the album artwork were taken by Jonathan Mannion and Matthew Rolston.

Release and promotion
Full Moon was originally set to be released on November 20, 2001, but was delayed for March 5, 2003. The album's promotional tour started in the United Kingdom with live performances of "What About Us?" on CD:UK on February 21 and on Top of the Pops the following day. The promotion continued in Germany with an interview which aired on VIVA Plus in March. Afterwards, the album's release party was held on March 4 in New York City and was attended by celebrities such as Jay-Z, Ananda Lewis, Al Sharpton, Zab Judah, Kid Capri and Bill Duke. Norwood promoted the album in the United States by performing on BET's 106 & Park on March 4, Total Request Live and The Early Show on March 5, Late Night with Conan O'Brien on March 8, Live with Regis and Kelly on March 12, The Oprah Winfrey Show on March 18, and The Tonight Show with Jay Leno on March 28. On April 19, Norwood performed the album's title track on Dick Clark's American Bandstand's 50th Anniversary Celebration, which aired on American Broadcasting Company (ABC) on May 3. Furthermore, she appeared on the covers of Vibe and Honeys April 2002 issues. However, the promotion was halted as Norwood gave birth to her and Big Bert's daughter Sy'rai Iman Smith on June 16, 2002. The end of her pregnancy and the birth were documented via the four-episode reality television series Brandy: Special Delivery, which aired on MTV from June 18 until July 9; the series also chronicled events related to the promotion of Full Moon, including the release of its third and final single "He Is".

Singles
"What About Us?" was released as the album's lead single on January 2, 2002, receiving mixed to positive reviews from music critics. Debuting at number 42 on the US Billboard Hot 100, it went on to peak at number seven, as well as peaking at number three on the Hot R&B/Hip-Hop Songs. Internationally, the song reached the top ten in Australia, Denmark, New Zealand, Scotland, Switzerland, and the United Kingdom, while peaking atop the UK R&B Chart. The song's highly animated, futuristic accompanying music video, directed by Dave Meyers, introduced a sexier image of Brandy, portraying her as a male-ruling character in an alternate universe. "What About Us?" has been certified gold by the Australian Recording Industry Association (ARIA) for shipments of 35,000 copies. At the 2002 MTV Video Music Awards, the song's accompanying music video was nominated for Viewer's Choice.

"Full Moon" was released as the second single on April 1, 2002 and was met with critical acclaim. Debuting at number 68 on the Billboard Hot 100, it peaked at number 18 in its tenth week on the chart, also peaking at number 16 on the Hot R&B/Hip-Hop Songs. In the United Kingdom, the song peaked at numbers 15 and four on the UK Singles Chart and the R&B chart, respectively. The song's accompanying music video, directed by Chris Robinson, features nearly-six-months-pregnant Norwood telescoping at night and attending a house party where she meets a man with whom she is eventually riding off through Los Angeles, watching the rising full moon.

"He Is" was released as the third and final single exclusively in the United States on September 17, 2002. The song itself received positive response from critics, but was dismissed as a weak choice for a single. It failed to enter the Billboard Hot 100, peaking at number 78 on the Hot R&B/Hip-Hop Songs.

Critical reception

Full Moon was met with generally mixed reviews. At Metacritic, it received an average score of 60 out of 100. Album of the Year rated the album 62 out of 100, based on their assessment of the critical consensus. In his review for Entertainment Weekly, journalist Craig Seymour gave Full Moon an A− rating, saying that "where [Rodney] Jerkins' herky-jerky stylings come off cold on Jacko's latest, they embolden 23-year-old Brandy as she learns the difference between teen heartbreak and grown-up betrayal, [suggesting] maturity and the high price that often comes with it." Stephen Thomas Erlewine from AllMusic was critical with the album's length of over 70 minutes but considered it Norwood's most assured, risky album yet, stating: "Full Moon comes the closest to being a full-fledged, well-rounded album, as well as establishing a personality as a singer [...] There are plenty of moments here that are seductively smooth and even the filler goes down smoothly." He gave the album four out of five stars.

Slant Magazine writer Sal Cinquemani rated the album three stars out of five and compared it to Janet Jackson's 1986 album Control, commenting: "For the most part, Full Moon is certainly a forward-minded album, lifting Brandy's typically schmaltzy brand of pop-R&B to a new, edgier plateau [...] The all-grown-up Miss Moesha seems to be making her final transition from sitting up in her room to sitting on top of the world." J. Victoria Sanders from PopMatters considered Full Moon "an achievement" and added: "As she proclaims her womanhood with throaty whispers and assertive wails, [...] this grown-up Brandy [...] has one thing in common with the cherubic girl she used to be: she still sings with relaxing humility and stylequalities the music world is in dire need of right about now." Washington Post writer Britt Robson called the album a "refreshingly sexy" record "of honest growth and modest virtues" as well as "of slight refinements and logical maturation". John Aizlewood from The Guardian found that "without Jerkins, Brandy stumbles more easily. At 73 minutes Full Moon is far too flabby, but there's nothing here to derail her."

Billboard praised Full Moon for its ballads and the leading single but was unsatisfied with the album as a whole, stating that "those expecting more from the same [as 'What About Us?'] will be disappointed, it's a fairly paint-by-numbers affair." Similarly, People found that "the rest of Full Moon can't sustain the bizarre brilliance of 'What About Us?'. While much of the CD brandishes a similar edge, with electronic wizardry made for headphone listening, it showcases the producing team more than its singer. Brandy has one of the more distinctive voices around, so it's a shame that she so often gets lost in the beat-heavy mix." Devon Thomas, writer for The Michigan Daily, was generally disappointed with the album. He said that "heavily producer-driven, the album follows the template that catapulted her sophomore album to multi-platinum status. The tradition (or condition) continues on her junior outing, [which] exhibits the same ole Jerkins production we've heard time and time before, just slightly altered (or 'updated') and equipped." Critical with mainstream R&B in general, he further summed: "We know it'll be another hit, another platinum plaque for the Moe-ster, but will this album go down on any 'Best of the Decade' lists? Highly unlikely." Rolling Stone dismissed the album as "frantic, faceless, fake-sexy R&B", while Piers Martin from NME declared it a "velvet-lined bucket of slush". In his "Consumer Guide", Robert Christgau gave the album a "dud" rating.

Accolades

|-
! scope="row"| 2002
| MTV Video Music Award
| Viewer's Choice
| "What About Us?"
| 
| 
|-
! scope="row"| 2003
| Grammy Award
| Best Contemporary R&B Album
| Full Moon
| 
| 
|-
! scope="row"| 2003
| Soul Train Lady of Soul Award
| Best R&B/Soul or Rap Song
| "Full Moon"
| 
| 
|}

Commercial performance

In the United States, Full Moon debuted at number two on the Billboard 200 and atop the Top R&B/Hip-Hop Albums in the issue dated March 23, 2002, marking Brandy's highest debuts on both charts. Selling 156,000 copies in its first week, the album fell short of the O Brother, Where Art Thou? soundtrack (2000) by less than 4,000 copies. Spending thirty weeks on the latter chart, the album shifted about 700,000 copies within the first three months of its US release. It also debuted and peaked at number eleven on the US Top Internet Albums. The album was certified platinum by the Recording Industry Association of America (RIAA) on April 5, 2002, and has sold 1.1million units in the country.

Full Moon peaked at number eight on the Canadian Albums Chart. On July 19, 2002, it was certified gold by Music Canada for shipments of 50,000 copies in the country. In the United Kingdom, the album became Brandy's first top-ten album, debuting and peaking at number nine on the UK Albums Chart with first-week sales shy of 25,000 units. Upon its release, it was immediately certified gold by the British Phonographic Industry (BPI), indicating shipments of 100,000 copies. Full Moon also became Brandy's second album to top the UK R&B Albums Chart. As of 2021 the album has sold 148,000 units in the UK. In Japan, Full Moon debuted at number 15 on the Oricon Albums Chart, becoming her second top-twenty entry on the chart. It was eventually certified gold by the Recording Industry Association of Japan (RIAJ) for shipments of more than 100,000 units. Full Moon also became Brandy's first top-ten entry in Germany and Switzerland, reaching numbers eight and seven, respectively.

Impact and legacy

Since its release, Full Moon has garnered retrospective recognition from musicians, vocalists and music producers, particularly within the R&B and urban contemporary gospel genres. Regarded as "the blueprint of modern R&B," the album is credited with "continuing Norwood's artistic progression and introducing a new facet of herself, destroying the image of a teenager in exchange for that of a grown woman," with Billboard calling it "the one to cement her as an R&B trailblazer" as well as the "gold standard for modern R&B vocalists". Music analyst Khaaliq Crowder wrote in a retrospective review published in blog Leeky Crowder that with Full Moon "Brandy abandoned the old image to successfully present a fully developed new one. She no longer used boxer braids nor did it carry the image of the girl-next-door, the singer of "Have You Ever?" returned in 2002 with long, sleek straight hair and heavy makeup, adding warm, sultry mannerisms to her music on songs like "Like This" and "Come a Little Closer"."

Musicians such as Ambré, Chris Brown, Jacob Latimore, Lil Mo, Mary Mary, PJ Morton, Keke Palmer, Kierra Sheard, Hope Tala and Tank referenced the album and its vocal work as influential. The vocal work on the album sparked the idea of Norwood gaining the subjective nickname "Vocal Bible". Norwood herself has ranked Full Moon among her favorites in her album discography numerous times.

Songwriter Sean Garrett credits the vocal work on the album for his approach to writing, saying "I take a lot from what [Brandy] and Rodney did on the Full Moon album. I was extremely impressed with it and I always try to outdo that album." B.Slade spoke of the album, commenting Full Moon single-handedly changed the vocal game. "It has been the template for vocal choices and background vocal arrangements [for years]." R&B singer Melanie Fiona especially admired the singer's work on that album, dubbing Norwood the "Harmony Queen". Neo soul singer India.Arie often cites the album, particularly the song "He Is" as being the template for a wide array of singers. Canadian R&B singer Keshia Chanté credited the album for inspiring her writing for her album Night & Day, while American singer Luke James referred to Full Moon as the "bible" of 2000s contemporary R&B, calling it the "blueprint of how to do vocals". British soul performer Daley included a cover version of the album cut "When You Touch Me" on his Daley, Unplugged tour; the song was also paid tribute to in gospel form by Sunday Best artist Y'anna Crawley. German pop singer Rüdiger Skoczowsky, who cites Brandy as one of his main vocal inspirations, included a cover of "Love Wouldn't Count Me Out" on some of his live shows.

Track listing

Notes
  signifies a vocal producer
  signifies an additional producer

Personnel 
Credits adapted from the liner notes of Full Moon.

 J.D. Andrew – assistant engineer
 Lori Andrews – strings
 Marc Baptiste – photography
 Jim Bottari – engineer
 Stuart Brawley – engineer
 Thomas Bricker – design, art director
 David Campbell – string arrangements, conducting
 Tom Coyne – mastering
 Reginald Dozier – engineer
 Jan Fairchild – engineer
 Andrew Feigenbaum – A&R
 Aaron Fishbein – guitar
 Jon Gass – mixing
 Brad Gilderman – mixing
 Larry Gold – cello
 Edward Green – strings
 Kenneth B. Hertz – assistant engineer
 Gerald Heyward – drums
 Michael Huff – assistant engineer
 Michael Jackson – vocal assistance
 Rodney Jerkins – executive producer
 Jubu – guitar
 Craig Kallman – executive producer, A&R
 Suzie Katayama – conductor
 Lila Kazakova – strings
 Kimbo – violin
 Thor Laewe – engineer
 Marc Stephen Lee – assistant engineer
 Manny Marroquin – mixing
 Eugene Mechtovich – strings
 Patrick Morgan – strings
 Michele Nardone – strings
 Brandy Norwood – executive producer, vocal producer, A&R
 Dave Pensado – mixing
 Isaac Phillips – guitar
 Ray-J – vocal assistance
 Michael "Wolf" Reaves – engineer
 Steve Robillard – assistant engineer
 Robin Ross – strings
 Ron Shapiro – executive producer
 Dexter Simmons – mixing
 Marston Smith – strings
 Thomas Tally – strings
 Joe Lewis Thomas – vocal assistance
 Javier Valverde – assistant engineer
 Charles Veal, Jr. – strings
 Zheng Wang – strings
 Joe "Flip" Wilson – piano
 Tibor Zelig – strings
 Yihuaw Zhao – strings

Charts

Weekly charts

Year-end charts

Certifications

Release history

See also
 Album era
 List of Billboard number-one R&B albums of 2002
 List of UK R&B Albums Chart number ones of 2002

Notes

References

Bibliography

External links
 
 

2002 albums
Albums produced by Rodney Jerkins
Albums produced by Warryn Campbell
Atlantic Records albums
Brandy Norwood albums